Parametron is a logic circuit element invented by Eiichi Goto in 1954. The parametron is essentially a resonant circuit with a nonlinear reactive element which oscillates at half the driving frequency. The oscillation can be made to represent a binary digit by the choice between two stationary phases π radians (180 degrees) apart.

Parametrons were used in early Japanese computers from 1954 through the early 1960s. A prototype parametron-based computer, the PC-1, was built at the University of Tokyo in 1958. Parametrons were used in early Japanese computers due to being reliable and inexpensive but were ultimately surpassed by transistors due to differences in speed.

See also
 Quantum flux parametron
 Eiichi Goto
 MUSASINO-1
 Magnetic amplifier
 Magnetic logic
 Parametric oscillator

References

Digital electronics
Magnetic devices
Magnetic logic computers